Heswall (previously Barnston-Gayton-Heswall-Oldfield, 1973 to 1979) is a Wirral Metropolitan Borough Council ward in the Wirral South Parliamentary constituency in England.

Councillors

References

Wards of Merseyside
Politics of the Metropolitan Borough of Wirral
Wards of the Metropolitan Borough of Wirral